The Best of The Christians is a compilation album by English music ensemble The Christians, released in 1993 on Island Records. It includes most of the band's singles from their first three studio albums—The Christians (1987), Colour (1990) and Happy in Hell (1992)—plus new song "The Perfect Moment" and a cover of Bob Marley's "Small Axe", originally the B-side to their 1988 "Harvest for the World" single.

Track listing
"Forgotten Town" (Henry Priestman)
"Harvest for the World" (The Isley Brothers)
"The Perfect Moment" (Priestman, Mark Herman)
"What's in a Word" (Priestman)
"Born Again" (Priestman)
"Words" (music: Seán Ó Riada, lyrics: Priestman)
"Ideal World" (Herman)
"The Bottle" (Gil Scott-Heron)
"When the Fingers Point" (Priestman)
"Father" (Garry Christian)
"Greenback Drive" (Remix) (Priestman)
"Hooverville (And They Promised Us the World)" (Priestman, Herman)
"Small Axe" (Bob Marley)

Charts

Certifications

References

External links
The Best of The Christians at Discogs

1993 compilation albums
Island Records compilation albums
The Christians (band) albums
Albums produced by Laurie Latham